Bjorn Mikhail Poonen (born 27 July 1968 in Boston, Massachusetts) is a mathematician, four-time Putnam Competition winner, and a Distinguished Professor in Science in the Department of Mathematics at the Massachusetts Institute of Technology.  
His research is primarily in arithmetic geometry, but he has occasionally published in other subjects such as probability and computer science.
He has edited two books, 
and his research articles have been cited by approximately 1,000 distinct authors.  
He is the founding managing editor of the journal Algebra & Number Theory, and serves also on the editorial boards of Involve and the A K Peters Research Notes in Mathematics book series.

Education
Poonen is a 1985 alumnus of Winchester High School in Winchester, Massachusetts.  In 1989, Poonen graduated from Harvard University with an A.B. in Mathematics and Physics, summa cum laude. He then studied under Kenneth Alan Ribet at the University of California, Berkeley, completing a PhD there in 1994.

Academic positions
Poonen held postdoctoral positions at Mathematical Sciences Research Institute and Princeton University and served on the faculty of the University of California, Berkeley from 1997 to 2008, before moving to MIT.
He has also held visiting positions at the Isaac Newton Institute (1998 and 2005), the Université Paris-Sud (2001), Harvard  (2007), and MIT (2007).

Major honors and awards
 Fellow of the American Mathematical Society, 2012.
 American Academy of Arts and Sciences: elected in 2012
 Chauvenet Prize: the 2011 winner, for his article "Undecidability in number theory"
 Miller Research Professorship – University of California Berkeley.
 David and Lucile Packard Fellowship
 Sloan Research Fellowship
 William Lowell Putnam Mathematical Competition: winner in 1985, 1986, 1987, and 1988 (the only other four-time winners since 1938 are Don Coppersmith, Arthur Rubin, Ravi D. Vakil, Gabriel Carroll, Reid W. Barton, Daniel Kane and Brian R. Lawrence).
 International Mathematical Olympiad: silver medalist in 1985.
 American High School Mathematics Examination: only participant (out of 380,000) to receive a perfect score in 1985.

Trivia
 He co-authored a paper entitled "How to spread rumors fast".

References

External links
 Personal webpage
 

1968 births
Living people
20th-century American mathematicians
21st-century American mathematicians
Harvard University alumni
University of California, Berkeley alumni
Academic staff of Paris-Sud University
Putnam Fellows
People from Winchester, Massachusetts
Fellows of the American Academy of Arts and Sciences
Fellows of the American Mathematical Society
International Mathematical Olympiad participants
Sloan Research Fellows
Simons Investigator
Winchester High School (Massachusetts) alumni
Number theorists
Arithmetic geometers
American people of Ojibwe descent